"TV Dinners" is a song by American band ZZ Top from their 1983 album Eliminator. It was produced by band manager Bill Ham, and recorded and mixed by Terry Manning. The song is a simple, beat-driven tune with lyrics about pre-packaged, oven-ready meals. Promoted for radio play in the US, and released commercially as a single in the UK, it reached number 38 on the Billboard Top Rock Tracks chart. Robert Palmer recorded "TV Dinners" for his 2003 album Drive.

Recording
Guitarist Billy Gibbons once said he played a 1955 Gretsch Roundup while recording "TV Dinners". He also told Dean Zelinsky that he played a burgundy Dean ML throughout the recording of Eliminator. Longtime ZZ Top recording engineer Terry Manning told an online forum of professional sound engineers that Gibbons alternated between two Dean Guitars for the great majority of the album, including "98% of all guitar on this album, whether lead or rhythm".

Music video
The "TV Dinners" video shows a man alone in his high-tech live-work space during an electrical storm, reheating a TV dinner within which forms a goblin. The retro sci-fi look departed from the previous Eliminator videos. 

Director by Marius Penczner and his crew used stop-motion clay animation to show the goblin's claw emerging to change channels on a TV remote, repeatedly returning the multiple TV screens to display scenes of ZZ Top performing the song. Later, the goblin rises from the foil-wrapped package to steal and eat some potato chips while the man is distracted playing a ZZ Top–themed driving game. "TV Dinners" was released in December 1983, with critics observing that the video was better than the song.

Credits and personnel
Billy Gibbons – guitar, vocals
Dusty Hill – keyboards
Frank Beard – drums
Linden Hudson – Preproduction Engineer 
Terry Manning – Engineer

Charts

References

ZZ Top songs
1983 singles
Songs written by Frank Beard (musician)
Songs written by Dusty Hill
Songs written by Billy Gibbons
1983 songs
Warner Records singles
Song recordings produced by Bill Ham